Charaxes usambarae is a butterfly in the family Nymphalidae. It is found in Tanzania. The habitat consists of lowland, sub-montane and montane forests.

The larvae feed on Albizia - A. zimmermannii and A. gummifera.

Subspecies
Charaxes usambarae usambarae (north-eastern Tanzania)
Charaxes usambarae maridadi Collins, 1987 (north-eastern Tanzania)

Taxonomy
Charaxes usambarae is a member of the large species group Charaxes etheocles. It was first described as a subspecies of Charaxes pembanus.

Differs from Charaxes mccleeryi in the more dentate wing margins

References

Victor Gurney Logan Van Someren, 1966 Revisional notes on African Charaxes (Lepidoptera: Nymphalidae). Part III. Bulletin of the British Museum (Natural History) (Entomology) 45-101. page 73 Plate 9 Figures 65 and 66, 69 and 70

External links
Images of C. usambarae usambarae Royal Museum for Central Africa (Albertine Rift Project)
Charaxes usambarae usambarae images at BOLD
Charaxes usambarae maridadi images at BOLD
Charaxes usambarae maridadi f. bella images  at BOLD
Charaxes usambarae maridadi f. maridadi images at BOLD
Charaxes usambarae maridadi f. pseudorosae images at BOLD
Charaxes usambarae usambarae f. collinsi images at BOLD
Charaxes usambarae usambarae f. usambar images at BOLD

Butterflies described in 1952
usambarae
Endemic fauna of Tanzania
Butterflies of Africa